David Krakauer may refer to:
 David Krakauer (musician)
 David Krakauer (scientist)